The acronym CHBC can refer to:

 CHBC-DT, a television station in British Columbia owned-and-operated by Global.
 Capitol Hill Babysitting Cooperative, a Washington D.C. cooperative for babysitting used as an allegory in economics